Lutz Marten is a German linguist and africanist. He is currently professor of general and African linguistics at SOAS University of London. Since 2020, he is also the editor of the Transactions of the Philological Society.

Academic career
After studying English language and literature, philosophy and African studies at the University of Hamburg, Marten joined SOAS for a Masters programme in linguistics in 1993, where, in 1995, he subsequently began his doctoral studies under the supervision of Ruth Kempson. In 1999, he completed his thesis entitled Syntactic and Semantic Underspecification in the Verb Phrase.

Research
Between 2014 and 2018, Marten was the principal investigator of the research project Morphosyntactic variation in Bantu: Typology, contact and change, which was funded by the Leverhulme Trust. He is also involved in the development of the Dynamic Syntax framework project, which is supported by grants from the ESRC, EPSRC, the Leverhulme Trust and AHRC.

Selected publications

References

External links
Institutional website

Linguists from Germany
Living people

Year of birth missing (living people)
University of Hamburg alumni
Alumni of SOAS University of London
Academics of SOAS University of London